The Uruguay women's national under-16 and under-17 basketball team is a national basketball team of Uruguay, administered by the Federación Uruguaya de Básquetbol - "FUBB".

It represents the country in international under-16 and under-17 (under age 16 and under age 17) women's basketball competitions.

It appeared at the 2017 South American U17 Basketball Championship for Women.

See also
Uruguay women's national basketball team
Uruguay women's national under-19 basketball team
Uruguay men's national under-17 basketball team

References

External links
Uruguay Basketball Records at FIBA Archive

U-17
Women's national under-17 basketball teams